are citizens of the United States residing in Japan. As of June 2022, there were 57,299 American citizens registered as foreign residents of Japan, forming 1.9% of the total population of registered aliens, according to statistics from Japan's Ministry of Justice. This made Americans the eighth-largest group of foreign residents in Japan, having been surpassed in number by Vietnamese residents, Nepalese residents, and Indonesian residents since 2011.

In addition to registered foreign residents, a significant number of American military personnel, civilian workers, and their dependents live in Japan due to the presence of the United States military in Japan under the U.S.–Japan Security Treaty. Approximately 70% of American military personnel in Japan are stationed in Okinawa Prefecture.

History
The first Americans came to Japan in 1791 aboard two merchant vessels from Massachusetts which landed at Kushimoto, Wakayama, south of Osaka. Because of the isolationist sakoku policy of the Tokugawa shogunate, the vessels landed under the pretense that they were taking refuge from a storm. They began negotiations with Japanese authorities about the possibility of opening trade relations, but made no headway, and departed after eleven days. One early American resident of Japan was Ranald MacDonald, who arrived in Japan in 1848 and was the first native speaker to teach the English language in Japan. In 1830, Nathaniel Savory was among the first settlers to colonize the remote Bonin Islands, an archipelago which was later incorporated by Japan. 

Larger numbers of Americans began to enter Japan after the 1854 Convention of Kanagawa, under which Commodore Matthew C. Perry pressured Japan to open to international trade. Many Americans served as foreign government advisors in Japan during the Meiji period (1868–1912).

Prior to World War II, it was a common practice for first-generation issei Japanese immigrants in the United States to send their nisei children, who were American citizens, to Japan for education.

Following Japan's surrender in World War II, hundreds of thousands of American military personnel were stationed in Japan during its occupation. After the occupation ended, a large number of American military bases remained in Japan under the Treaty of Mutual Cooperation and Security between the United States and Japan, and the United States continued to control the Ryukyu Islands until the reversion of Okinawa to Japan in 1972.

The postwar period also saw in increase in cultural interaction between the United States in Japan. Americans in Japan were active in sports, such as baseball, professional wrestling, and sumo. Meanwhile, academics and scholars who spent significant time in Japan, including Edwin O. Reischauer, Donald Keene, Edward Seidensticker, John Whitney Hall, and Donald Richie, became influential cultural critics and contributed to the development of the field of Japanese studies in the 1950s and 1960s.

Since 1987 the Japanese government has administered the JET Programme, an initiative that employs thousands of overseas college graduates as Assistant Language Teachers in Japanese public schools, usually for a period of one to three years. Approximately half of these teachers are from the United States.

Notable people
This is a list of American citizens whose notability is related to their past or current residence in Japan.

 Akebono Tarō, first foreign-born sumo wrestler to reach the rank of yokozuna
 Atsugiri Jason, comedian and television personality
 Randy Bass, NPB baseball player and triple crown winner
 Billy Blanks, fitness guru and martial artist
 Thane Camus, television personality
 Walter Tenney Carleton, founding director of NEC
 Dante Carver, actor
 William S. Clark, agricultural advisor in Hokkaido
 William Copeland, founder of one of the first beer breweries in Japan
 Henry Willard Denison, diplomat and lawyer during the Meiji era
 Kent Derricott, television personality
 Leah Dizon, singer and model
 Ernest Fenollosa, art historian during the Meiji era
 Charlotte Kate Fox, lead actress in the television series Massan
 Marty Friedman, guitarist from Megadeth, later television contributor
 Patrick Harlan, comedian and television personality
 James Curtis Hepburn, creator of Hepburn romanization
 Jero, enka singer
 Carolyn Kawasaki, model and television personality
 Crystal Kay, singer
 Konishiki Yasokichi, first foreign-born sumo wrestler to reach ōzeki rank
 Tony László, journalist and activist, basis of a character in My Darling Is a Foreigner
 Benjamin Smith Lyman, mining engineer during the Meiji era
 Luther Whiting Mason, pioneer of music education in Japan
 Edward S. Morse, known as "the father of Japanese archaeology"
 Mina Myoi, singer from Twice
 Tuffy Rhodes, NPB all-time home run leader among foreign-born baseball players
 Bob Sapp, fighter and television personality
 Shelly, model and television presenter
 Dave Spector, television commentator
 Takamiyama Daigorō, first foreign-born sumo wrestler to win the top division championship
 Hikaru Utada, singer
 Bobby Valentine, baseball manager for the Chiba Lotte Marines
 James R. Wasson, first non-Japanese person to receive the Order of the Rising Sun

See also
 Japan–United States relations
 Embassy of the United States, Tokyo

References

Further reading
 
 

American diaspora in Asia
+
 
American emigration